Scymnus apetzi is a species of beetle found in the family Coccinellidae. It is found in Europe.

It lives on common crops, for example Apple trees and feeds on aphids.

References 

Coccinellidae
Beetles described in 1846